Ceto is a fifteenth-century Javanese-Hindu temple that is located on the western slope of Mount Lawu (elev. 1495 m above sea level) on the border between Central and East Java provinces.

Cetho is one of several temples built on the northwest slopes of Mount Lawu in the fifteenth century. By this time, Javanese religion and art had diverged from Indian precepts that had been so influential on temples styles during the 8-10th century. This area was the last significant area of temple building in Java before the island's courts were converted to Islam in the 16th century. The temples' distinctiveness and the lack of records of Javanese ceremonies and beliefs of the era make it difficult for historians to interpret the significance of these antiquities.

It is close to Sukuh temple.

See also

 In Java
 Gunung Padang Megalithic Site
 Candi Kethek, 11th-16th century similar smaller site in Central Java.
 Candi of Indonesia
 Prambanan Temple, 6th-9th century UNESCO heritage Hindu temple in Central Java.
 Sunda Kingdom, 7th-16th century Indianised Hindu kingdom in Western and Central Java.
 Taruma Kingdom, 2nd-6th century Indianised Hindu kingdom of Western Java.

 In Indonesia
 Greater India
 Indianisation
 History of Indian influence on Southeast Asia
 Hinduism in Indonesia
 Buddhism in Indonesia

 Other related 
 List of places with columnar jointed volcanics

References

External links
 

Hindu temples in Indonesia
Archaeological sites in Indonesia
Pyramids in Indonesia
Religious buildings and structures in Central Java
Mount Lawu
Cultural Properties of Indonesia in Central Java
Religious buildings and structures in East Java
Javanese culture
Places in Hindu worship
Tourist attractions in East Java
History of East Java
Archaeology of Indonesia